Allah Verdi Khan (also Romanized as Allāh Verdī Khān) is a village in Aladagh Rural District, in the Central District of Bojnord County, North Khorasan Province, Iran. At the 2006 census, its population was 1,071, in 259 families.

References 

Populated places in Bojnord County